Parliamentary elections were held in Hungary on 15 June 1975. The Hungarian Socialist Workers' Party was the only party to contest the elections, and won 215 of the 352 seats, with the remaining 137 going to independents selected by the party. 

All prospective candidates had to accept the program of the Patriotic People's Front, which was dominated by the HSWP. While it was possible for more than one candidate to run in a constituency, only 34 of 352 constituencies had more than one candidate.

Results

References

Elections in Hungary
Parliamentary
Hungary
One-party elections
Election and referendum articles with incomplete results

hu:Országgyűlési választások a Magyar Népköztársaságban#1975